Binocular is the debut studio album by American singer-songwriter Kevin Rudolf, who, at the time, along with another mixer, used the pseudonym Binocular when the album was released. It was released on May 22, 2001.

Background
In the early 2000s, Rudolf began work on the group of songs that, nine months later, would form the basis for his major label debut. Written, produced and engineered by Rudolf himself, and mixed by Mark Saunders, the album took nine months to complete. Rudolf was signed to Madonna's record label, Maverick, which released the album under the pseudonym, Binocular.

A song from the album, "You", was used in the TV show Smallville (2001), and a song not appearing on the album, "Maybe You're Gone" (written by Danny Scherr), was later used over the end credits of the movie The Girl Next Door (2004).

Track listing

Reception
Despite receiving positive reviews, the album went largely unnoticed in the United States. The single "Deep" however, saw success in the Philippines.

Release history

References

2001 debut albums
Maverick Records albums
Kevin Rudolf albums